Sir John Inglis of Cramond, 2nd Baronet (September 1683 – 3 March 1771) was Postmaster General for Scotland, the son and heir of Sir James Inglis, 1st Baronet of Cramond, Edinburghshire by his spouse Anne, daughter of Sir Patrick Houstoun, 1st Baronet of that Ilk. He succeeded his father in 1688.

Life
baptised at Cramond Kirk on 23 September.

In 1717 he succeeded James Anderson WS (who had held the post since 1715) as Deputy Postmaster General (the role of Postmaster General at that point being held by the monarch). The physical handling of the mail was handled by a Mr Main or Mein from a property north of the Old Tolbooth on the Royal Mile in Edinburgh, being relocated to Parliament Close and then to the Cowgate in the reign of George III. In 1741 Inglis's role passed to Hamilton of Innerwick.

On 24 June 1708 Sir John married his cousin, Anne Cockburn (d.1772), daughter of Adam Cockburn of Ormiston, Lord Justice Clerk, and had issue: four sons (below) and five daughters.

 Sir Adam Inglis, 3rd Baronet (1714–1772), d.s.p.
 Sir John Inglis, 4th Baronet (c.1716–1799)
 Patrick Inglis, a merchant in Edinburgh.
 Rear-Admiral Charles Inglis (1731–1791)

References

The Extinct and Dormant Baronetcies of England, Ireland, and Scotland, by Messrs. John and John Bernard Burke, second edition, London, 1841, p. 627.

1683 births
1771 deaths
Baronets in the Baronetage of Nova Scotia
Politicians from Edinburgh